Island Dreams is a 2013 Filipino romantic comedy film directed by Gino M. Santos and Aloy Adlawan, written by Adlawan, and starring Louise delos Reyes and Alexis Petitprez. It was an official selection in the 39th Metro Manila Film Festival under the New Wave Category and won the Most Gender-Sensitive Film Award.

Plot 
An unaccredited tour guide and a heartbroken tourist form a romantic bond as they explore the wilds of Philippine Islands.

Cast 
 Louise delos Reyes as Julie
 Alexis Petitprez as Zach
 Irma Adlawan as Marie
 Natasha Villaroman as Stacy
 Chanel Latorre as Karen

Production 
Producer Kenneth Au wrote the original screenplay, but it was deemed too ambitious.  He hired director Adlawan to revise the storyline to fit a more modest budget. However, the theme of the struggle between the head and the heart was kept. Au stated that the title has a double meaning: 'ISLAND' presents the more than 7,000 islands of the Philippines and the character Zach, played by Alexis Petitprez heading to the island for personal reasons; 'DREAMS' represents Julie's ambition to become famous and that we all have dreams.

Adlawan invited Santos to collaborate on Island Dreams.  Santos, who had always wanted to make a romantic comedy, agreed and set out to make a film that would be "up to international standards".

Reception 
Rito P. Asilo of the Philippine Daily Inquirer wrote, "The film is so adorable that it's easy to disregard its implausibilities [...] Moreover, Island Dreams will win you over with its infectious optimism and charming whimsy, anchored on the vibrant chemistry of Delos Reyes and Petitprez. For hopeless romantics, this is the movie to see!".

References

External links 
 
 

2013 romantic comedy films
2013 films
Filipino-language films
Philippine independent films
Philippine romantic comedy films
2013 independent films
2010s English-language films